The 2015 Bank of America 500 was a NASCAR Sprint Cup Series race scheduled to be held on October 10, 2015 at Charlotte Motor Speedway in Concord, North Carolina but pushed ahead to October 11 due to rain. Contested over 334 laps on the 1.5 mile (2.4 km) intermediate speedway, it was the 30th race of the 2015 NASCAR Sprint Cup Series season, fourth race of the Chase and first race of the Contender Round. Joey Logano won the race, his fourth of the season. Kevin Harvick finished second. Martin Truex Jr., Denny Hamlin and Kurt Busch rounded out the top-five.

Matt Kenseth won the pole for the race and led 72 laps before retiring from the race after slamming the wall late in the event and finished 42nd. Logano led a race high of 227 on his way to winning the race. The race had 14 lead changes among 10 different drivers, as well as nine caution flag periods for 44 laps.

This was the 12th career win for Joey Logano, fourth of the season, first at Charlotte Motor Speedway and third at the track for Team Penske. He jumped to the top of the points standings with a six–point lead over Harvick. Despite being the winning manufacturer, Ford left Charlotte trailing Chevrolet by 67–points third in the manufacturer standings.

The Bank of America 500 was carried by NBC Sports on the cable/satellite NBCSN network for the American television audience. The radio broadcast for the race was carried by the Performance Racing Network and Sirius XM NASCAR Radio.

Report

Background

The race was held at Charlotte Motor Speedway, a motorsports complex located in Concord, North Carolina, United States. The complex features a  quad-oval track that hosts NASCAR racing including the prestigious Coca-Cola 600 on Memorial Day weekend, the Sprint All-Star Race, and the Bank of America 500. The speedway was built in 1959 by Bruton Smith and is considered the home track for NASCAR with many race teams located in the Charlotte area. The track is owned and operated by Speedway Motorsports, Inc. (SMI) with Marcus G. Smith (son of Bruton Smith) as track president.

The  complex also features a state-of-the-art quarter mile (0.40 km) drag racing strip, ZMAX Dragway. It is the only all-concrete, four-lane drag strip in the United States and hosts NHRA events. Alongside the drag strip is a state-of-the-art clay oval that hosts dirt racing including the World of Outlaws finals among other popular racing events.

Matt Kenseth entered tied for the points lead with Joey Logano, Denny Hamlin, Carl Edwards, Martin Truex Jr., Kurt Busch, Jeff Gordon, Brad Keselowski, Kyle Busch, Ryan Newman, Dale Earnhardt Jr. and Kevin Harvick.

Restart zone

Entry list
The entry list for the Bank of America 500 was released on Monday, October 5 at 11:10 a.m. Eastern time. Forty-five cars were entered for the race. All but Ryan Blaney and Michael McDowell were entered in the previous week's race at Dover.

First practice

Qualifying

He said that his team had "worked on qualifying all day. Obviously our goal was to come here and try to sit on the pole but to qualify well, and we accomplished that. They brought a real fast car here in the spring. Jason did a great job with our qualifying setup in the spring. We came here with the relatively same stuff. We’re just trying to make our stuff better.” Kyle Busch, after qualifying second, said that he liked "coming to Charlotte. This is certainly a good track for me. We look forward to Saturday night being another good night for us. Adam (Stevens) and the guys made did a great job making some good adjustments for qualifying there."

Qualifying results

Practice (post-qualifying)

Second practice

Final practice

Race

First half

Start
The race was scheduled to start at 7:21 p.m., but rain forced the race to be pushed to the next day. Under clear blue North Carolina skies, Matt Kenseth led the field to the green flag at 12:32 p.m. The field didn't make it half a lap before debris brought out the first caution of the race. The back of the field accordioned back and Jeb Burton rammed into the rear of Cole Whitt. Kyle Busch was able to take the lead before the caution flew.

The race restarted on lap 5. Matt Kenseth drove by Busch to take the lead. He pulled out to a one-second lead over Joey Logano after 10 laps. The second caution of the race flew on lap 26. This was a scheduled competition caution due to overnight rain. J. J. Yeley was tagged for his crew being over the wall too soon and restarted the race from the tail-end of the field.

The race restarted on lap 31. Yeley was black-flagged for unapproved adjustments and forced to come to pit road and fix the adjustment. Kasey Kahne was running 12th when he made an unscheduled stop on lap 42 after brushing the wall in turn 1. He rejoined the race in 41st two laps down. The third caution of the race flew on lap 61 for a single-car wreck on the backstretch. Rounding turn 2, Kahne suffered a right-front tire blowout and slammed the wall. He said that he didn't understand "why either one of those tires went down. Obviously, we were doing something wrong to have two tire failures like that. It’s discouraging, but that’s the way it goes.” He went on to finish 43rd. Greg Biffle was tagged for speeding on pit road and restarted the race from the tail-end of the field.

The race restarted on lap 66. Carl Edwards tapped the back of Dale Earnhardt Jr., got him loose and sent him into the wall on lap 70. Eventually, Earnhardt cut down his right-front tire, rode the wall and brought out the fourth caution of the race on lap 75. Speaking on the incident, he said that Edwards "got a great run on us and drove down into one and got in the back of us a little bit. I don’t know if I cut him off or not. But he drove in there pretty hard and ran over the left rear quarter panel of the car and got in the fence." Joey Logano opted not to pit under the caution and assumed the lead.

Second quarter
The race restarted on lap 81. Austin Dillon commenced a cycle of green flag stops pitting on lap 121. Logano hit pit road the next lap and handed the lead to Jimmie Johnson. He pitted on lap 124 and gave the lead to Kyle Larson. He pitted on lap 127 and surrendered the lead to Carl Edwards. He pitted the next lap and the lead cycled back to Joey Logano.

Debris on the backstretch brought out the fifth caution of the race on lap 167.

Second half

Halfway

The race restarted on lap 174. The sixth caution of the race flew on lap 177 after Matt Kenseth made contact with the wall in turn 4. He said that his situation "just kind of snowballed, you know. We were real fast out front. We were kind of tight in traffic and got behind pitting, and then I missed the pit stall tryng [sic] to come around the 21 (Ryan Blaney) and had to back up in the pit, and that put us back there, so just kind of snowballed. But with Ryan (Newman), I honestly don’t know. I’ve got to look at it. He went up like I thought he was broke, so I went up through the middle, and I thought I left him plenty of room and then next thing I know, I was pointed at the fence.”

The race restarted on lap 182. The seventh caution of the race flew the same lap after Justin Allgaier blew his engine in turn 1.

The race restarted on lap 190. Fluid in turn 2 brought out the eighth caution of the race on lap 195. Following the race, Dale Earnhardt Jr. elaborated on the oil in turn 2. After deciding to hit pit road at the last second, Kyle Larson got turned by Kyle Busch who decided not to pit at the last second. Larson said that he was told "to do what everybody around me was doing. The No. 22 (Logano) was staying out, so I was committed to staying out. (But) as soon as I turned right to stay out, they said ‘pit, pit, pit.’ I hung a left, and Kyle was there.” Busch said that he didn't "know what happened. My guys don’t deserve to be put in these situations year in and year out, but we are for some reason. It’s tough, but we’re going to have to battle back with what we’ve got." Both were tagged for commitment violations as they both hit the commitment cone and were forced to restart the race from the tail-end of the field.

The race restarted on lap 201. Matt Kenseth made contact with another car on the restart and made an unscheduled stop to fix the right-front wheel well. To add insult to injury, he was black-flagged for having too many crew members over the wall and was forced to serve a drive-through penalty. Kurt Busch kicked off a cycle of green flag stops on lap 231. Logano pitted on lap 232 and gave the lead to Austin Dillon. He pitted the next lap and gave the lead to Jeff Gordon. He pitted on lap 234 and gave the lead to Clint Bowyer. He pitted the next lap and handed the lead to Sam Hornish Jr. The ninth caution of the race flew with 95 laps to go for a single-car wreck in turn 3. Matt Kenseth suffered a right-front tire blowout and slammed the wall. He said that he's taking the Contender Round "one race at a time to be honest with you. I mean, you do the best you can every week and if this is the best I can do it’s amazing I have a job. These are never the kind of days you want to have for sure, but it’s just one of those days. We shouldn’t have ever been back there to start with. My mistakes and they cost us today. So we’ll just move on from this and get ready for Kansas.” Hornish pitted under the caution and handed the lead back to Joey Logano.

Fourth quarter

The race restarted with 88 laps to go. Jimmie Johnson was running in the top-five when his engine blew up on the backstretch with 77 laps to go. With 65 laps remaining, Kevin Harvick began reeling in Joey Logano. Martin Truex Jr. kicked off the final round of green flag stops with 52 laps to go. Joey Logano made his final stop with 50 laps to go and handed the lead to Sam Hornish Jr. He made his final stop with 34 laps to go and the lead cycled back to Logano.

He continued to maintain a 1.5 to two second lead over Kevin Harvick with 10 laps to go. He continued to maintain that gap as he scored his 12th career victory.

Post-race

Driver comments
After the race, Logano said that his team "had a great car. Todd Gordon and this Shell/Pennzoil team, all of Team Penske, you always want to win it. Charlotte is everybody’s home turf and you want to make it happen here." He also added that the win "makes Talladega way easier. I know that’s on everyone’s mind when this round starts and last year we won Kansas when it was the first race of this round and now we were able to get it this time at Charlotte. We’ll get lots of sleep here the next couple of weeks.”

Harvick said that he "thought things went well. The guys did a great job on pit road and we were able to capitalize with their solid day and gaining track position. Car wasn't great all weekend but we were able to make headway on it and make gains and to do the things we needed to do to make it better. In the end that's what you want to do on a day like today, and we made a really good day out of it. Obviously you want to win, but with so many guys having trouble you want to capitalize on a top five run, too.”

Following a third–place finish, Truex said that this race "was honestly the worst weekend we’ve had all season long as far as how I felt about the race car. I thought after practice we’d be lucky to run 15th. So proud of (crew chief) Cole (Pearn) and my engineers and just everybody for sticking with it, and having a good game plan. You know, we had a good car today. We fought track position all day but once we got up towards the front we had good speed.”

Following his eighth–place finish, Gordon said that he "couldn't be happier with the entire effort that we put out there. We made some great adjustments to get us back in this thing. I'm real happy with eighth. The problem is you've got six of the guys we're racing in the championship right there ahead of us. But we didn't lose much to them and I thought it was a really strong effort."

Oil on the track

Kyle Busch and Dale Earnhardt Jr. were critical of NASCAR's cleanup effort of the oil following Justin Allgaier's engine expiration on lap 182. Busch sarcastically thanked NASCAR for the cleanup job.

In his weekly appearance on the Sirius XM NASCAR Radio program The Morning Drive, NASCAR Executive Vice-President and Chief Racing Development Officer Steve O'Donnell told Mike Bagley and Pete Pistone that the officials in the tower didn't see the oil and that he couldn't "debate Kyle and (Earnhardt)[.] They’re in the race cars. If they say they hit it, it’s not something that we saw out there. We’ll continue to talk to them and see what maybe we can improve on in the future. We had personnel even out on the track, getting down on almost their hands and knees to make sure there wasn’t any."

Race results

Race statistics
14 lead changes among 10 different drivers
9 cautions for 44 laps
Time of race: 3 hours, 35 minutes, 5 seconds
Average speed: 
Joey Logano took home $347,373 in winnings.

Race awards
 Coors Light Pole Award: Matt Kenseth (27.759, 
 3M Lap Leader: Joey Logano (227 laps)
 American Ethanol Green Flag Restart Award: Joey Logano
 Duralast Brakes "Bake In The Race" Award: Kyle Busch
 Freescale "Wide Open": Kevin Harvick
 Ingersoll Rand Power Move: Aric Almirola (2 positions)
 MAHLE Clevite Engine Builder of the Race: Roush-Yates Engines, #22
 Mobil 1 Driver of the Race: Joey Logano (146.4 driver rating)
 Moog Steering and Suspension Problem Solver of The Race: Jeff Gordon (crew chief Alan Gustafson (–0.053 seconds))
 NASCAR Sprint Cup Leader Bonus: Joey Logano, ($20,000)
 Sherwin-Williams Fastest Lap: Matt Kenseth (Lap 6, 28.246)
 Sunoco Rookie of The Race: Matt DiBenedetto

Media

Television
NBCSN covered the race on the television side. Rick Allen, three–time Charlotte winner Jeff Burton and Steve Letarte had the call in the booth for the race. Dave Burns, Mike Massaro, Marty Snider and Kelli Stavast handled pit road on the television side.

Radio
PRN had the radio call for the race, which was simulcast on Sirius XM NASCAR Radio. Doug Rice, Mark Garrow and Wendy Venturini called the race from the booth when the field was racing down the front stretch. Rob Albright called the race from a platform outside turn 2 when the field was racing through turns 1 and 2. Pat Patterson called the race from atop the turn 4 stands when the field was racing through turns 3 and 4. Brad Gillie, Brett McMillan, Jim Noble and Steve Richards handled pit road on the radio side.

Standings after the race

Drivers' Championship standings

Manufacturers' Championship standings

Note: Only the first sixteen positions are included for the driver standings.

References

Bank of America 500
Bank of America 500
NASCAR races at Charlotte Motor Speedway